Trond Henry Blattmann (born 23 August 1964) is a Norwegian politician for the Labour Party.

From 2009 to 2011 he was a part of Stoltenberg's Second Cabinet as a political adviser in the Ministry of Government Administration, Reform and Church Affairs. He served as a deputy representative to the Parliament of Norway from Vest-Agder during the term 2013–2017.

Locally, Blattmann has been a caucus leader in Kristiansand city council. He is a son of Aud Blattmann. He lost a son in the 2011 Utøya shooting and became leader of the National Support Group for the victims.

References

1964 births
Living people
Deputy members of the Storting
Labour Party (Norway) politicians
Politicians from Kristiansand